Twist for Max is a public art work by artist Bernard Kirschenbaum located at the Lynden Sculpture Garden near Milwaukee, Wisconsin. The abstract sculpture is a column of twisting aluminum; it is installed on the lawn.

See also
 Way Four

References

1974 sculptures
Outdoor sculptures in Milwaukee
Aluminum sculptures in Wisconsin
1974 establishments in Wisconsin